Three Bags Full: A Sheep Detective Story (original German title: Glennkill: Ein Schafskrimi) is 2005 novel by Leonie Swann. It is a detective story featuring a flock of anthropomorphic Irish sheep out to solve the murder of their shepherd. Written originally in German, the novel became an international bestseller, and has been translated into more than 30 languages.

Plot
In the Irish village of Glenkill, George Glenn is a shepherd who is a loner, estranged from his wife, and is fond only of his sheep. Every day, after he lets them out to graze, he reads to them from romance adventure novels and textbooks on sheep diseases. At the start of the book, the sheep find George dead, pinned to the ground by a spade. The rattled sheep decide that they must find his killer. This turns into a difficult task, as sheep can’t talk to people; and though they understand the human conversations they listen in on, like the one between George’s widow Kate and Bible-basher Beth Jameson, they do not always understand the details. Not even the smartest of them, Miss Maple, Othello and Mopple the Whale, can understand the human's behaviour, and are particularly confused by the neighbourhood priest, though they conclude that his name is evidently God. They are afraid to confront suspects like butcher Abraham Rackham, and are suspicious but fearful of their new shepherd Gabriel O’Rourke, who is raising a flock of sheep for slaughter. And even after a series of providential discoveries and brainwaves reveals the answer to the mystery, they still have to figure out how to let the humans know.

List of sheep characters 

 Miss Maple: Known as the smartest sheep in Glenkill, she leads the investigation into George's death.
 Sir Ritchfield: Head ram, sometimes seems to have a wandering mind. Forgets things easily especially when worked up over something.
 Othello: The literal black sheep of the flock, is somewhat mysterious. He hasn't been with the flock long, and hints at a dark and troubled past.
 Mopple the Whale: A merino who remembers everything, and likes to eat.
 Zora: A pensive black-faced ewe with a weakness for clouds and abysses.
 Melmoth: Sir Ritchfield's long-lost twin brother.

List of human characters
Below is a list of notable human characters and their roles. Contains plot details.

 George Glenn: Is the shepherd of the flock. He is lonely, depressed, suicidal and feels lost. George is married to Kate and has a mistress, Lily. George has an adult daughter, Rebecca; but he has no relationship with her. Before his death, he wrote a letter to Rebecca. George is a drug trafficker. He uses the sheep as mules to transport marijuana. Unlike the townspeople, George is not interested in expanding the tourist market in his town of Glenkill. With his friend Ham the butcher, George discovered the dead body of McCarthy.
 Kate: Once caught in a love triangle between George and the butcher Ham, Kate married George. She gained weight after marriage. Ham continues to love her and pine for her.
 Beth Jameson: A devout Christian who lives alone. Beth tells Rebecca that George was never her boyfriend. She left Glenkill for a mission in Africa; and, when she returned, everything had changed. An anxious woman, Beth smells bad to the sheep. After George's sheep reenact his murder at the Mad Boar Pub, Beth speaks to the audience and reveals that George came to her before his death. George told Beth his plans of suicide. After his suicide, Beth drove the spade through his body, as George requested.
 Abraham Rackham (Ham): the local butcher and one of George's few friends. Together with George, he discovered the body of McCarthy. Ham loves George's wife, Kate, and installs cameras at his shop so that he can record the moments when she visits his shop. One misty day after George's death Ham tries to steal a sheep from George's flock, falls off a cliff and is paralyzed.
 Father William: The sheep name Father William 'God.' He sees the sheep around town and in his church conducting their investigation and becomes very fearful of them.
 Inspector Holmes: An ineffective investigator. He does not solve George's murder case, or the McCarthy murder case.
 Gabriel: A shepherd with a flock of sheep raised for mutton. George's sheep like him at first and consider him to be a good shepherd, but learn that he is not a very good shepherd. Gabriel is motivated by money.
 Josh Baxter: The landlord of the Mad Boar pub. Josh Baxter is interested in expanding the tourist trade in Glenkill because he will benefit financially.
 Tom O'Malley: An alcoholic who finds the dead body of George the shepherd. During the smartest sheep contest, Tom is drunk and correctly understands that George's sheep are acting out his murder.
 The 'Master Hunter': This character is never named by the author, or the human characters in the story. The sheep recognize his smell and call him the master hunter. He may be involved with drug trafficking.
 Rebecca: George's daughter. Her mother is not revealed. She volunteers to take the flock of sheep to Europe and because the sheep choose her over Gabriel, she inherits the flock and shepherding duties. Before his death, George sent her a letter. She intentionally delayed a reply and regretted that decision after his death.

Themes
Largely humorous in character, the novel displays a strong knowledge of sheep behavior, biology, husbandry and breeds (the merino and hebridean are present, among others). Using the perspective of the flock, Swann makes comedic jabs at human character and institutions.

Reception 
According to Kirkus Reviews, the sheep characters outshine the human ones, and "the sustained tone of straight-faced wonderment is magical". The Guardian review praised Swann for "gnawing" and "wriggling" her way into a gap in the anthropomorphized animal detective novel, thereby succeeding to avoid hackneyed "gumshoe" tropes. The Independent, in a rave review, found the sheep to be a successful and appealing parable for humanity, and concluded that the book has "charm without whimsy, and is touching without being sentimental". Publishers Weekly called Three Bags Full "refreshingly original", and observed that Swann's "sheep's-eye view and the animals' literal translation of the strange words and deeds of the human species not only create laugh-out-loud humor but also allow the animals occasional flashes of accidental brilliance".

References

External links
 Three Bags Full at Random House's U.S. site

2005 German novels
German detective novels
German mystery novels
Fictional sheep
Novels set in Ireland
Novels about animals